Enarthronota is a suborder of mites in the order Oribatida. There are about 14 families and more than 450 described species in Enarthronota.

Families
These 14 families belong to the suborder Enarthronota:

 Arborichthoniidae J. & P. Balogh, 1992
 Atopochthoniidae Grandjean, 1949
 Brachychthoniidae Thor, 1934
 Cosmochthoniidae Grandjean, 1947 (cosmochthoniids)
 Eniochthoniidae Grandjean, 1947
 Haplochthoniidae Hammen, 1959
 Heterochthoniidae Grandjean, 1954
 Hypochthoniidae Berlese, 1910
 Nothridae Berlese, 1896
 Pediculochelidae Lavoipierre, 1946
 Phyllochthoniidae Travé, 1967
 Protoplophoridae Ewing, 1917
 Pterochthoniidae Grandjean, 1950
 Sphaerochthoniidae Grandjean, 1947

References

Further reading

External links

Acari
Articles created by Qbugbot